This article documents all the events in the sport of darts over the course of 2011.

PDC

Ladbrokes.com World Darts Championship

Players Championship Finals (1)

RTL7 International Masters

Premier League

UK Open

World Matchplay

European Championship

World Grand Prix

Grand Slam of Darts

Players Championship Finals (2)

PDC Pro Tour

(All matches – best of 11 legs)

Players Championships
Halle, January 29: Mervyn King 6–2 Vincent van der Voort
Halle, January 30: Ronnie Baxter 6–4 Antonio Alcinas
Derby, February 19: Jamie Caven 6–2 Adrian Lewis
Derby, February 20: John Part 6–0 Mark Walsh
Crawley, March 26: Paul Nicholson 6–4 Adrian Lewis
Crawley, March 27: Wes Newton 6–4 Paul Nicholson
Vienna, May 14: John Part 6–0 Denis Ovens
Vienna, May 15: Vincent van der Voort 6–5 Phil Taylor
Crawley, May 21: Gary Anderson 6–3 Terry Jenkins
Crawley, May 22: Paul Nicholson 6–3 Terry Jenkins
Barnsley, June 11: Paul Nicholson 6–4 Steve Brown
Barnsley, June 12: Andy Smith 6–2 Dave Chisnall
Nuland, June 18: Gary Anderson 6–5 Wes Newton
Nuland, June 19: Gary Anderson 6–3 Andy Smith
Ontario, August 27: John Part 6–4 Wes Newton
Ontario, August 28: Ronnie Baxter 6–2 Kevin Painter

UK Open Regional Finals
Qualifier 1 (Barnsley, February 26): Steve Brown 6–3 Ian White
Qualifier 2 (Barnsley, February 27): Michael Smith 6–5 Dave Chisnall
Qualifier 3 (Wigan, March 12): Adrian Lewis 6–4 Robert Thornton
Qualifier 4 (Wigan, March 13): Vincent van der Voort 6–4 Raymond van Barneveld
Qualifier 5 (Barnsley, April 16): Gary Anderson 6–4 Phil Taylor
Qualifier 6 (Barnsley, April 17): Phil Taylor 6–1 Joe Cullen
Qualifier 7 (Wigan, April 30): Gary Anderson 6–2 Phil Taylor
Qualifier 8 (Wigan, May 1): Phil Taylor 6–3 Colin Osborne

BDO/WDF

Lakeside World Darts Championship

WDF Category 1 Events

Dutch Open at NH Hotel/Congress centre, Veldhoven, February 6
Quarter-Finals (Losers €500, Best of 7 legs) Dean Winstanley 4–2 Geert de Vos, Tony O'Shea 4–1 Braulio Roncero, John Walton 4–1 Benito van de Pas, Martin Adams 4–1 Stefan Gerritsen
Semi-Finals (Losers €1,250, Best of 3 sets, 5 legs per set) Dean Winstanley 2–0 Tony O'Shea, Martin Adams 2–1 John Walton
Final (Winner €4,500 Runner-up €2,250, Best of 5 sets, 5 legs per set) Martin Adams 3–2 Dean Winstanley

Scottish Open at Normandy Cosmopolitan Hotel, Renfrew, February 20
Quarter-Finals (Losers £125, Best of 5 legs) Clive Barden 3–2 Willy van de Wiel; Peter Mitchell 3–2 Steve Douglas; Gary Robson 3–1 Carl Beattie; Robbie Green 3–0 Jerry Hendriks
Semi-Finals (Losers £400, Best of 7 legs) Clive Barden 4–3 Peter Mitchell; Robbie Green 4–2 Gary Robson
Final (Winner £2,250 Runner-up £1,000, Best of 9 legs) Robbie Green 5–4 Clive Barden

German Open in Bochum, April 16. Matches played in sets, three legs per set.
Quarter-Finals (Losers €300) Garry Thompson 2–0 John Walton; Tony O'Shea 2–0 Gary Robson; Benito van de Pas 2–0 Ted Hankey; Jan Dekker 2–0 Geert de Vos
Semi-Finals (Losers €600) Tony O'Shea 2–0 Garry Thompson; Benito van de Pas 2–0 Jan Dekker
Final (Winner €2,400 Runner-up €1,200) Benito van de Pas 3–2 Tony O'Shea

WDF Category 2 Events

German Gold Cup, January 29 (Winner €800, Runner-up €400) Thomas Junghans  beat  Swen Seifert
Isle of Man Open, March 13 (Winner £5,000, Runner-up £1,000) Ted Hankey  4–1  Ron Meulenkamp
Mariflex Open, March 20 (Winner €2,500, Runner-up €1,000) Jan Dekker  3–1  Tony West
Virginia Beach Dart Classic, March 27 (Winner $1,200, Runner-up $600) Tom Sawyer  beat  Ryan van der Weit
Antwerp Open, April 24 (Winner €2,300, Runner-up €1,000) Tony West  3–1  Frans Harmsen
Dortmund Open, May 14 (Winner €1,000, Runner-up €450) Jean Marie Rubais  beat  Salmon Renyaan
BDO International Open, June 11 (Winner £3,000, Runner-up £800) Wesley Harms  4–2  Stephen Bunting
Canadian Open, June 18 (Winner C$1,000, Runner-up C$500) Dave Cameron  5–1  Bruce Davey
New Zealand Masters, June 19 (Winner C$1,000, Runner-up C$500) Craig Caldwell  6–5  Koha Kokiri
England Open, June 26 (Winner £5,000, Runner-up £2,000) Gary Robson  6–2  Ted Hankey
England Masters, July 17 (Winner £2,000, Runner-up £800) John Walton  5–3  Ross Montgomery
British Classic, July 23 (Winner £3,000, Runner-up £1,000) Dean Winstanley  2–0  Garry Thompson
Pacific Masters, July 23 (Winner A$1,100, Runner-up A$600) Damon Heta  6–4  Andrew Townes
Japan Open, July 24 (Winner ¥250,000, Runner-up ¥150,000) Hiroaki Shimizu  beat  Katsuya Aiba
Belgium Open, August 7 (Winner €2,300, Runner-up €1,000) Ross Montgomery  3–0  Ron Meulenkamp
New Zealand Open, August 10 (Winner NZ$1,500, Runner-up NZ$700) Greg Moss  4–2  Jonathan Silcock

External links
2011 PDC Calendar
2011 BDO Calendar
2011 WDF Calendar